So Far (subtitled Their Classic Collection') is a compilation album by New Zealand group Dragon, released in January 1988 through J&B Records (JB 325), under licence from CBS Records and PolyGram Records. The album was released as the band's cover version of Kool & The Gang's "Celebration" was in the top 20 in Australia, on the RCA Records label. 

So Far peaked at number 26 on the Australian Kent Music Report.

Track listing 
Side A
 "April Sun in Cuba" (Marc Hunter, Paul Hewson) – 3:27	
 "Still in Love With You" (Paul Hewson) – 3:26	
 "Get that Jive" (Paul Hewson) – 2:45	
 "Are You Old Enough?" (Paul Hewson) – 4:08 	
"O Zambezi"	(Robert Taylor) – 4:30
 "Rain" (Johanna Pigott, Marc Hunter, Todd Hunter) – 3:40
 "Speak No Evil" (Alan Mansfield, Johanna Pigott, Todd Hunter) – 4:00
 "Fool" (Johanna Pigott, Todd Hunter) – 3:31

Side B
 "Dreams of Ordinary Men" (Alan Mansfield, Doane Perry, Johanna Pigott, Todd Hunter, Todd Rundgren) – 4:02	
 "Western Girls" (Alan Mansfield, Marc Hunter, Sharon O'Neill, Todd Rundgren) – 4:07
 "Body and the Beat" (Marc Hunter, Robert Taylor) – 4:26
 "Magic" (Marc Hunter, Robert Taylor) – 3:57	
 "Burn Down the Bridges" (Marc Hunter) – 3:23
 "Promises" (Johanna Pigott, Marc Hunter, Todd Hunter) – 4:11
 "Company" (Jenny Hunter-Brown, Todd Hunter) – 3:55
 "Konkaroo" (Paul Hewson) – 3:26

Charts

References 

Dragon (band) albums
1988 greatest hits albums
Compilation albums by New Zealand artists
Albums produced by Peter Dawkins (musician)
Albums produced by Todd Rundgren